Iron Hands may refer to:

 Iron Hands (Pokémon), a Pokémon species
 Iron Hands (Warhammer 40,000), fictional characters in the game Warhammer 40,000
 Iron Hands, a 2004 novel by Jonathan Green for Warhammer 40,000

See also
 Iron Hand (disambiguation)
 Iron hand (prosthesis), a kind of prosthetic limb popular in Europe in the 15th–19th centuries
 Iron Fist (disambiguation)